Miss Venezuela 1978 was the 25th edition of Miss Venezuela pageant held at Club de Sub-Oficiales in Caracas, Venezuela, on April 28, 1978, after weeks of events. The winner of the pageant was Marisol Alfonzo, Miss Guárico.

The pageant was broadcast live by Venevision and it was the last to be broadcast on TV in monochrome, as the television broadcasts switched to color from the following year onward.

Results
Miss Venezuela 1978 - Marisol Alfonzo (Miss Guárico)
1st runner-up - Patricia Tóffoli (Miss Falcón)
2nd runner-up - Doris Fueyo (Miss Anzoátegui)
3rd runner-up - Liliana Mantione (Miss Lara)

Special awards
 Miss Fotogénica (Miss Photogenic) - Carmen Hernández (Miss Apure)
 Miss Simpatía (Miss Congeniality) - Sandra Guevara (Miss Táchira)
 Miss Amistad (Miss Friendship) - Isabel Martínez (Miss Zulia)

Delegates

 Miss Anzoátegui - Doris Fueyo Moreno
 Miss Apure - Carmen Hernández
 Miss Aragua - Maria Trinidad Araya
 Miss Barinas - Linda Barone
 Miss Bolívar - Mara Marino
 Miss Carabobo - Susana Barrios
 Miss Departamento Vargas - Rita Briceño
 Miss Distrito Federal - Mary Carmen La Red
 Miss Falcón - Patricia Tóffoli Andrade
 Miss Guárico - Marisol Alfonzo Marcano
 Miss Lara - Liliana Mantione Rizzo
 Miss Mérida - Elba Santander
 Miss Miranda - Maritza Poleo
 Miss Monagas - Maria Gracia Potts
 Miss Nueva Esparta - Minerva Garaboa
 Miss Sucre - Zaida Hurtado
 Miss Táchira - Sandra Guevara
 Miss Trujillo - Ninoska Cristancho
 Miss Zulia - Isabel Martínez

External links
Miss Venezuela official website

1978 beauty pageants
1978 in Venezuela